The masked shining parrot (Prosopeia personata), also known as the masked parrot, masked musk parrot, or the yellow-breasted musk parrot is a species of parrot in the family Psittaculidae. It is endemic to Viti Levu in Fiji. Its natural habitats are subtropical or tropical moist lowland forest, subtropical or tropical mangrove forest, subtropical or tropical moist montane forest, arable land, and rural gardens. It is threatened by habitat loss.

Description 
It is 47 cm long and weighs 322 g. It has a black mask on its face, and has a mainly bright green body. The center of its breast is yellow, turning into orange towards the abdomen. The outer webs of the primary fathers on the wing are blue or purple. Its tail feathers are green, and washed with blue.

References

Prosopeia
Endemic birds of Fiji
Parrots of Oceania
Parrot, Masked shining
Parrot, Masked shining
Birds described in 1848
Taxa named by George Robert Gray
Taxonomy articles created by Polbot